Mystery Road may refer to:
 Mystery Road (film), a 2013 Australian neo-western crime film
 Mystery Road (TV series), an Australian television drama series beginning in 2018
 Mystery Road (album), a 1989 album by Drivin N Cryin
 The Mystery Road, a 1921 British drama film

See also
Gravity hill, a geographical phenomenon where a downward-sloping hill appears to slope upward